Rathore is a surname of Indian origin. 

People with this surname include:
 Adarsh Rathore, Indian journalist
 Aditi Rathore, Indian actress
 Amar Singh Rathore, nobleman of Marwar Kingdom in India
 Biram Singh Rathore of Marwar, ruler of Marwar Kingdom in India
 Chandrasen Rathore, ruler of Marwar Kingdom in India
 Durgadas Rathore, warrior of Marwar Kingdom in India
 Fateh Singh Rathore, Indian conservationist
 Ganga Rathore of Marwar, ruler of Marwar Kingdom in India
 Hariom Singh Rathore, Indian politician
 Jaimal Rathore, ruler of Merta in India
 Karni Singh Rathore, Indian soldier
 Kishan Singh Rathore, Indian soldier
 Laxman Singh Rathore, Indian scientist
 Maldev Rathore, ruler of Marwar Kingdom in India
 Mohar Singh Rathore, Indian social worker
 Nathu Singh Rathore, Indian soldier
 R. S. Rathore, Indian cricket umpire
 Raghavendra Rathore, Indian fashion designer
 Raghuvendra Singh Rathore, Indian judge
 Raja Mumtaz Hussain Rathore, Pakistani politician
 Rajendra Rathore (chemist), Indian chemist
 Rajendra Singh Rathore, Indian politician
 Rajiv Rathore, Indian cricketer
 Rajiv Rathore (cricketer, born 1968), Indian cricketer
 Rajyavardhan Singh Rathore, Indian politician
 Reshma Rathore, Indian actress
 Rodmal Rathore, Indian politician
 S. S. Rathore, Indian civil engineer
 Satal Rathore of Marwar, ruler of Marwar Kingdom in India
 Shweta Rathore, Indian athlete
 Suja Rathore of Marwar, ruler of Marwar Kingdom in India
 Sultan Singh Rathore, Indian police officer
 Ratan Singh Rathore, ruler of Ratlam.

See also 
 Rathod (surname)

Surnames of Indian origin